Yassine El Had (born 5 March 1984 in Casablanca) is a Moroccan footballer who plays as goalkeeper for SCC Mohammédia.  He made his debut in 2009 replacing the injured goalkeeper Tarik El Jarmouni.

References

External links
Yassine El Had at Footballdatabase

1984 births
Living people
Footballers from Casablanca
Moroccan footballers
Raja CA players
Chabab Rif Al Hoceima players
AS FAR (football) players
SCC Mohammédia players
Botola players
Association football goalkeepers